Captain Frederick Norton Goddard (1861 – May 28, 1905) was a Republican Party politician from New York City. He was an anti-poverty advocate and an anti-gambling advocate.

Biography

He was born in 1861 in New York City to Joseph Warren Goddard, and he had a brother, Warren Norton Goddard. He was a descendant of the first wagon master general of the Army, John Goddard, under the command of George Washington. who built the John Goddard House Brookline, Massachusetts.

Frederick Norton Goddard attended the Anthon grammar school and then Harvard University, graduating in 1882. He then joined his father's business, J. W. Goddard and Sons. He married Alice Grenville Winthrop on November 22, 1898 in Manhattan.

After the death of his father he formed the Civic Club  and became an anti-gambling advocate trying to eliminate the numbers game.

In November 1901 he worked to get Albert J. Adams, the policy king incarcerated.

He died on May 28, 1905 at 9:30 am in Litchfield, Connecticut.

Legacy
He dedicated his adult life to fighting vice and corruption.  Though he and his brother Warren Goddard continued to operate J.W. Goddard & Sons (a leading purveyor of tailors' trimmings), Goddard's most notable accomplishment was rooting out the policy racket (an early form of the numbers game) in New York City.  Near the time of his early death, Goddard had succeeded in shaming the Western Union company out of its active cooperation with wire houses that allowed illegal off-track betting.  Today's OTB parlors are the legalized progeny of the former wire houses, immortalized in the movie The Sting.

References

1861 births
1905 deaths
American anti-poverty advocates
Anti-gambling advocates
Harvard University alumni
New York (state) Republicans